= Phanda Khurd =

- village
- Location within Madhya Pradesh Location within India
- Coordinates: 23.2168°N 77.2146478°E
- Country: India
- State: Madhya Pradesh
- District: Bhopal
- Tehsil: Huzur
- Elevation: 519 m (1,703 ft)

Population (2020)
  - Total: 621
- Time zone: UTC+5:30 (IST)
- ISO 3166 code: MP-IN
- 2011 census code: 482477

Phanda Khurd is a village in the Bhopal district of Madhya Pradesh, India. It is located in the Huzur tehsil and the Phanda block.

== Demographics ==
According to the 2011 census of India, Phanda Khurd has 122 households. The effective literacy rate (i.e. the literacy rate of population excluding children aged 6 and below) is 61.74%.

Demographics (2011 Census)
	Total	Male	Female
Population	539	272	267
Children aged below 6 years	79	39	40
Scheduled caste	65	29	36
Scheduled tribe	84	38	46
Literates	284	173	111
Workers (all)	272	157	115
Main workers (total)	101	68	33
Main workers: Cultivators	51	39	12
Main workers: Agricultural labourers	23	14	9
Main workers: Household industry workers	11	5	6
Main workers: Other	16	10	6
Marginal workers (total)	171	89	82
Marginal workers: Cultivators	11	7	4
Marginal workers: Agricultural labourers	63	37	26
Marginal workers: Household industry workers	77	35	42
Marginal workers: Others	20	10	10
Non-workers	267	115	152
